MV Empire MacKendrick was a Merchant Aircraft Carrier or MAC ship converted to become a grain ship.

The Burntisland Shipbuilding Company Ltd, Fife, Scotland, built her under order from the Ministry of War Transport and was delivered on 12 December 1943. As a MAC ship, only her air crew and the necessary maintenance staff were naval personnel. She was operated by William Thomson & Co (the Ben Line).

After the war the ship was converted to a grain carrier. In 1967, while under Bulgarian management, she was trapped in the Suez Canal by the Six-Day War. She was scrapped at Split in 1975.

See also
 List of aircraft carriers

External links
 FAA archive

References

World War II aircraft carriers of the United Kingdom
Bulk carriers
Grain ships
Empire MacKendrick
Empire ships
1943 ships